Bondurant may refer to:

 Bondurant (surname)
 Bondurant, Iowa, United States
 Bondurant, Kentucky
 Bondurant, Wyoming, United States
 Bondurant House (disambiguation)
 The Bondurant Years
 Bob Bondurant School of High Performance Driving, a racing school